Forbidden Love is a 1982 American TV film.

Plot
An older woman has an affair with a younger man.

Cast
Yvette Mimieux
Andrew Stevens

References

External links
Forbidden Love at IMDb

1982 television films
1982 films
Films directed by Steven Hilliard Stern